is a Japanese astronomer. He works at National Astronomical Observatory of Japan's Mizusawa VLBI observatory in Ōshū, and was the Science Team sub-Leader of the MUSES-C mission. He has discovered three asteroids.  With colleagues at the observatory, he has created a detailed topographic map of the Moon.

References

External links 
 "Detailed map shows dry Moon" - Canada
 "Crustal thickness of the Moon: Implications for farside basin structures" - GRL
 "Moonlight project - Observations of Lunar rotation and Ephemeris by optical methods on the Moon"
 Spacewarn Bulletin - NASA
 "Moon's Puzzling, Thick-Skinned Far Side" - Sky and Telescope 
 "New high-res maps suggest little water in moon" - Universe Today
 "CCD Centroiding Experiment for the Japan Astrometry Satellite Mission (JASMINE) and In Situ Lunar Orientation Measurement (ILOM)"
 "Development of an LD pumped Nd:YAG Oscillator for Space-borne LaserAItimeter"

Discoverers of asteroids

20th-century Japanese astronomers
Living people
Year of birth missing (living people)